Telegraph Hill is a mountain in Dukes County, Massachusetts. Pilot Hill is located west-southwest of Telegraph Hill.

References

Mountains of Massachusetts
Mountains of Dukes County, Massachusetts